Watsonian Squire is a British manufacturer of sidecars and trailers for attachment to motorcycles. The original business was established in 1912 by Thomas Fredrick Watson as the Patent Collapsible Sidecar Company Ltd. at Balsall Heath, Birmingham, England.

The current company is based in the heart of the Cotswolds at Blockley, near Moreton-in-Marsh, Gloucestershire.

History
'Fred' Watson founded the Patent Collapsible Sidecar Company, later renamed to Watsonian Folding Sidecar Company Ltd, after he built a folding sidecar that allowed him to get his motorcycle and sidecar combination through a narrow entrance to the yard at his house.

Early sidecars were initially built with wickerwork bodies, which were then replaced by ash frames with plywood or steel panels. During World War I the company built sidecars for use as motorcycle ambulances. In 1922, the company moved to Hockley in Birmingham. 
In 1930, the company was renamed to the Watsonian Sidecar Company Ltd. In the same year the factory was destroyed by fire and in 1931 the company moved to new premises in Greet.

In 1956, Watsonian took over the rights to the Swallow Sidecars name from Tube Investments.
Watsonian was an early supplier to the Swallow Sidecar Company, which after World War II was renamed to Jaguar Cars. From 1956, Watsonian started to manufacture sidecar bodies in glass-reinforced plastic (GRP).
As well as civilian models, they also manufactured sidecars for the RAC to use for roadside rescue.

In the 1970s, Watsonian used their expertise in GRP to diversify into production of hardtops for Land Rover and for sports cars. When the Land Rover contract ended in 1981, Watsonian was forced to scale back production and make several staff redundant. In 1984, the company moved to its current location in Blockley.

In 1988, Watsonian merged with Squire Sidecars to form Watsonian Squire. From 1999 until 2013, Watsonian were the UK distributor for Royal Enfield motorcycles which are now built in Chennai, India.

Squire 
Squire (founded 1973 in Bidford-on-Avon) is a British manufacturer of motorcycle sidecars that pioneered the design of the modern motorcycle trailer for being pulled behind a bike in the early 1980s. In 1988 Squire merged with the struggling Watsonian company to form Watsonian Squire, now the UK's largest sidecar producer.

In 2002 Motor Cycle News set a Guinness World Record for a motorcycle and trailer reaching a timed speed of 139.5 mph at Millbrook in Bedfordshire, UK, pulling a Squire D21 trailer behind a Kawasaki ZZ-R1100 motorcycle.

References

External links
 Official website
 Watsonian historic advertising

Sidecars
Manufacturing companies established in 1912
Companies based in Gloucestershire
1912 establishments in England